Edgena De Lespine (February 1882 – January 30, 1920) born Edgena Stoddart Brown, was a silent film and stage actress in the United States.

Early life 
Edgena Brown was born in Galveston, Texas. Her parents were John Stoddart Brown (1848–1912) and Helen A. Delespine Brown (1849–1910). Her father owned a hardware store.

Career 
De Lespine was an actress in plays and in vaudeville, and had several starring roles in silent films. She starred in the 1913 play London Assurance, and in The Good Within. She worked at Reliance until she moved to Biograph in 1914. She was considered a beauty. She made several films with child actress Runa Hodges, including Runa Plays Cupid, The Dream Home, and The House of Pretense.

Beyond acting, De Lespine advertised her willingness to do "New York shopping" for Texas women, without charge.

Personal life 
De Lespine married Eugene W. Tips (born 1874) in 1900. In 1915, she married her second husband, stock broker Henry Glover Hemming (1872–1921). She died on January 30, 1920. Her grave is in Woodlawn Cemetery in New York. Her second husband was killed the following year, after he married her twice-divorced sister, Helen Henderson.

Filmography
The Old Mam'selle's Secret (1912)
Votes for Women (1912), movie about suffrage
The Good Within (1913)
Twickenham Ferry (1913)
Runa Plays Cupid (1913)
Half a Chance (1913) 
Eternal Sacrifice
The Social Secretary (1913)
The Little Pirate (1913)
The Bawlerout (1913)
The Dream Home (1913)
Rowdy the Dog
Dick's Turning (1913)
Ashes (1913 film), story by Marion Brooks
London Assurance (1913 film) (1913), an adaptation of the play London Assurance
A Night of Terror (1913)
The Turning Point based on the play by Preston Gibson
The Higher Justice by Forrest Halsey (1913)
The Tangled Web (film) (1913)
The House of Pretense (1913)

References

External links

1882 births
1920 deaths
20th-century American actresses
Actresses from Texas
People from Galveston, Texas